Khatchik Hratchia Achadjian (June 2, 1951 – March 5, 2020) was an Armenian-American businessman, and politician who formerly served in the California State Assembly. He was a Republican who represented the 35th district, encompassing San Luis Obispo County and part of Santa Barbara County. He previously represented the 33rd district, and prior to being elected to the State Assembly, was also a member of the San Luis Obispo County Board of Supervisors. In 2016, he ran for the United States House of Representatives from the 24th district, but he was defeated in the primary election.

Early life, education, and Board of Supervisors
Achadjian was born in Jalala, near Chtaura in Lebanon, to Armenian parents, immigrating to the United States in 1971 and becoming a United States citizen in 1982. He first attended the Armenian Evangelical Elementary School in Jalala and, later, secondary school in Anjar. Afterwards, he studied in Cuesta College before graduating from Cal Poly with a Business Administration degree. He and his wife Araxie were married in 1984. In 1978, he purchased a small business that expanded into multiple stores and gas stations throughout San Luis Obispo County.

Achadjian was first elected to the San Luis Obispo County Board of Supervisors in 1998, serving until his election to the assembly in 2010. He served as chairman of the board in 2001 and 2006.

California Assembly
In 2010, Achadjian first ran as the Republican nominee for the California State Assembly, in the 33rd district. He won 58% of the popular vote against Democrat Hilda Zacarias.

By 2012, the district was redrawn into the 35th district. In the primary, Achadjian won 65% of the vote against Democrat Gerald Manata's 35%. In the general election, Achadjian won 61% to Manata's 39%.

Achadjian ran for a third term in 2014, winning 65% of the vote yet again in the primary, against the 35% of Democrat Heidi Harmon. In the general, Achadjian increased his performance slightly over his 2012 result, with 63% of the vote to Harman's 37%.

Throughout his time in the Assembly, Achadjian's voting record received perfect scores from such groups as the California Chamber of Commerce, the California Taxpayers Association, the National Federation of Independent Business, and the California Small Business Association.

Committee assignments
Assembly Committee on Banking and Finance
Assembly Committee on Jobs, Economic Development, and the Economy
Assembly Committee on Veterans Affairs
Assembly Joint Committee on Fairs, Allocations, and Classification
Assembly Joint Committee on Fisheries and Antiquities
Assembly Joint Legislative Audit

2016 congressional bid
In 2015, Achadjian announced his intention to run for the United States House of Representatives, from California's 24th congressional district, in the 2016 elections. The district's longtime incumbent, Democrat Lois Capps, had previously announced that she would not seek reelection. As a result, the field was significantly larger than in the past; Achadjian's competition included two other Republicans (both of whom, Justin Fareed and Matt Kokkonen, are former candidates for the same district in previous years), two independent candidates (including another former candidate, Steve Isakson), and four Democrats (including Santa Barbara Mayor Helene Schneider and Santa Barbara County Supervisor Salud Carbajal). Achadjian received endorsements from many prominent Republicans in the region, including Santa Barbara City Councilmen Frank Hotchkiss and Dale Francisco (the latter of whom was also Santa Barbara County Republican chair, and had previously run for the same district in 2014), and former actor Christopher Mitchum, the previous Republican nominee for the seat who lost to Capps in 2014.

In the lead-up to the primary on June 7, Achadjian raised roughly $750,000 in the congressional race. Although he was only the fourth-highest fundraiser in the race, he was generally considered to be the primary frontrunner due to arguably having more name recognition among voters than any other candidate, from either party. Polls released both by his own campaign and the Schneider campaign predicted that Achadjian would come in first in the open primary. However, despite this, he came in a narrow third with 27,545 (18.9%) total votes, only 1.6% behind Justin Fareed, who finished a distant second to Carbajal. Fareed went on to lose the general election to Carbajal.

Later life and death
Katcho Achadjian died peacefully on March 5, 2020, at the age of 68, due to unspecified health complications.

Electoral history

References

External links 
 Katcho for Congress official Congressional bid website

County supervisors in California
California Polytechnic State University alumni
Cuesta College alumni
Lebanese emigrants to the United States
2020 deaths
American people of Armenian descent
Lebanese people of Armenian descent
American politicians of Lebanese descent
Naturalized citizens of the United States
Republican Party members of the California State Assembly
People from Arroyo Grande, California
Businesspeople from California
1951 births
Ethnic Armenian politicians
21st-century American politicians